Anthony Rush (born September 1, 1996) is an American football nose tackle who is a free agent. After playing college football for UAB, he was signed by the Philadelphia Eagles as an undrafted free agent in 2019. He also played for the Oakland Raiders, Seattle Seahawks and Green Bay Packers.

Early life 
Rush is a native of Raleigh, North Carolina. He attended Cary High School. He played both defense and offense for his high school team, earning first-team All Southest Wake Athletic Conference honors as a junior.

College career
Because of problems with academics coming out of high school Rush spent his first two years of college at Northeast Mississippi Community College where he recorded 73 tackles and 4 sacks. In his two years at UAB, Rush recorded 77 tackles (20 for loss), 2 sacks and a interception returned for a touchdown.

Professional career

First stint with Eagles
Rush signed with the Philadelphia Eagles as an undrafted free agent on April 28, 2019. He was waived on July 27.

Oakland Raiders
Rush signed with the Oakland Raiders on August 1, 2019. He was waived during final roster cuts on August 31, 2019, but was re-signed to the team's practice squad on September 2.

Second stint with Eagles
On October 21, 2019, Rush was signed by the Philadelphia Eagles off the Raiders' practice squad. He was waived on September 5, 2020.

Seattle Seahawks
On September 9, 2020, Rush was signed to the Seattle Seahawks practice squad. He was elevated to the active roster on September 19 for the team's Week 2 game against the New England Patriots, and reverted to the practice squad after the game. He was promoted to the active roster on September 23. He was waived on October 27, 2020.

Chicago Bears
On November 10, 2020, Rush was signed by the Chicago Bears to the active roster. He was waived by the team on November 24.

Green Bay Packers
On November 25, 2020, Rush was claimed off waivers by the Green Bay Packers. He was waived by the Packers on December 31, 2020, and re-signed to the practice squad two days later. On January 25, 2021, Rush signed a reserve/futures contract with the Packers. He was waived on June 10, 2021.

Tennessee Titans
On July 26, 2021, Rush signed with the Tennessee Titans. He was released on September 21, 2021.

Atlanta Falcons
On September 23, 2021, Rush signed with the practice squad of the Atlanta Falcons.  On November 8, 2021, Rush was promoted to the active roster. Rush made his first career NFL start in Week 11 against the New England Patriots.

On March 17, 2022, Rush signed a one-year contract with the Falcons. He started the first four games before getting waived on October 6, 2022.

Third stint with Eagles
On November 24, 2022, Rush was signed to the Philadelphia Eagles practice squad. He was released on December 6.

Dallas Cowboys
On December 14, 2022, Rush was signed to the Dallas Cowboys practice squad.

NFL career statistics

Regular season

References

External links
UAB Blazers football bio
Oakland Raiders bio

Living people
1996 births
Players of American football from Raleigh, North Carolina
American football defensive tackles
Northeast Mississippi Tigers football players
UAB Blazers football players
Philadelphia Eagles players
Oakland Raiders players
Seattle Seahawks players
Chicago Bears players
Green Bay Packers players
Tennessee Titans players
Atlanta Falcons players
People from Cary, North Carolina
Dallas Cowboys players